Shin Dong-ok (Hangul: 신동옥; born 1977) is a South Korean poet.

Life 
Shin Dong-ok was born in Goheung County, South Korea in 1977. He completed a PhD program in Korean literature at Hanyang University and is working as a lecturer. He made his literary debut in 2001 when he won a poetry contest run by the journal The Poetry and Anti-Poetry. His poetry collections include Akgong, Anakiseuteu gita (악공, 아나키스트 기타 Musician, Anarchist Guitar) (2008) and Utgo chumchugo yeoreumhara (웃고 춤추고 여름하라 Laugh, Dance, and Summer Away) (2012). In 2010, he received the 5th Yun Dongju Literature Award for Young Writers.

Writing 
Poet Kang Jeong has described Shin Dong-ok as a “poet who uses a strange new language yet makes it flow effortlessly.” Shin’s poetry is usually dark and somber in tone, exploring themes such as death, extinction, despair, and incest. It provides introspection on human lives through motifs like drawing, singing, dancing, and other sensory activities. Shin’s first poetry collection, in which he adopts the persona of a musician, has been described by critic Yoo Jun as “having the echo of a string instrument. The echo represents solitude, pain, and the void.” His second poetry collection Utgo chumchugo yeoreumhara (웃고 춤추고 여름하라 Laugh, Dance, and Summer Away) reveals the poet’s desire to dance through language. He deconstructs the meaning and function of everyday language and attempts to create new meaning and poetic diction, which he does to expand perceptual horizons. In a commentary explaining why Shin was selected for the Nojak Literature Prize, poet Shin Yong-mok writes: “Above all, his pedantic and loquacious style has the power to make the reader glimpse a strange world hidden in between the lines. It is a curious phenomenon that occurs in the gap between matter and space, turmoil and silence.”

Works 
Poetry Collections

1. 『악공, 아나키스트 기타』(랜덤하우스코리아, 2008)

Musician, Anarchist Guitar. Random House Korea, 2008.

2. 『웃고 춤추고 여름하라』(문학동네, 2012)

Laugh, Dance, and Summer Away. Munhakdongne, 2012.

3. 『고래가 되는 꿈』(문예중앙, 2016)

Dream of Turning into a Whale. Munye Joongang, 2016.

Essay Collections

1. 『서정적 게으름』(서랍의 날씨, 2015)

Lyrical Laziness. Seorabui Nalssi, 2015.

Awards 
 2010: 5th Yun Dongju Literature Award for Young Writers
 2016: 16th Nojak Literature Prize

Further reading 
  함돈균, ｢악공은 미래의 음악을 살고 있는가｣, 『창작과비평』 여름호, 2008.
Ham, Don-gyun. “Is the Musician Living the Music of the Future?” Changbi, Summer 2008 Issue.

  오윤호, ｢시의 무늬들이 만들어내는 臭｣, 『열린시학』 여름호, 2008.
Oh, Yun-ho. “The Stench Created by Patterns of Poetry.” Open Poetics, Summer 2008 Issue.

  이찬, ｢음악적 순수 추상과 유토피아적 환상｣, 『문학과사회』 봄호, 2013.
Lee, Chan. “Musical Pure Abstraction and Utopian Fantasy.” Literature and Society, Spring 2013 Issue.

 박혜진, ｢드러누운 주체｣, 『오늘의 문예비평』 봄호, 2017.
Park, Hye-jin. “The Subject is Lying Down.” Literary Criticism Today, Spring 2017 Issue.

External links 
  제 404회 문장의 소리: 신동옥 404th Sound of Sentences: Shin Dong-ok. Munjang, last modified April 22, 2015.

References 

21st-century South Korean poets
Living people
1977 births
South Korean male poets
21st-century male writers